Verite Film Festival is an annual film festival of Kashmiri cinema held in Awantipora, Jammu and Kashmir, India.

History
Its first edition (2011) was organized by Parallel Post – an e-magazine in collaboration with Islamic University of Science & Technology (IUST), Awantipora and was held annually thereafter. It was the first National Students Film festival in Kashmir. The festival is aimed to explore the budding talent among the students in the field of film making. Twenty-two films were screened in the first edition of the film festival dealing with various ‘hard-hitting and pressing issues’ such as livelihood issues, loss of tradition and heritage, conflict and its various facets of presentation, drug abuse etc.

Aim of the festival
The objective of organizing this Film festival is to groom the potential of the young documentary film makers across the country and particularly from the Kashmir valley. Moreover, the festival will provide a launch pad for Kashmiri discourse whereby the upcoming student film makers will meet and interact with the established film makers and students throughout the country.

2011

In this year 22 films directed by young artists were screened dealing with various ‘hard-hitting and pressing issues’. Most of the films screened in the festival were about Kashmir Conflict  and its various facets of presentation, livelihood issues, loss of tradition and heritage, drug abuse etc.

A short animated movie ‘Hopscotch’ by cartoonist Malik Sajad revealed the story of divided Kashmir. Another documentary 'Patience on trial' by Naureen Farooq revolved around the wishes, hopes and needs of orphans.

The film In limbo, Kashmiris Half-widow's  a film by Lebul Nissa, Human Rights lawyer was about Half-widows of Kashmir ("half-widow", a term given to women whose husbands have completely disappeared and are still missing during the ongoing conflict in Kashmir.).

The event was first of its kinds and was praised by many dignitaries present at the festival. Noted poet Poet Zareef Ahmed Zareef expressed joy and said there is a dire need of noble teachers who will lead budding talent into the right direction. "The way they presented the various aspects of Kashmir is admirable. God has gifted Kashmir with the best talent. The day will definitely come when we will produce the better film makers to show the true story of our Land".

Awards

Twenty-two films were screened out of which Life on Wheels by Adil Shah won the award for the best film. Pankh by Nishant was adjudged the second prize winner and the third prize was given to three films - Lost by Ather Mohiuddin, Hopskotch by Malik Sajjad and Eidiyaan by Muhammad Irfan Dar and Aman Kaleem.

Films Screened

See also
Kashmiri cinema
Dogri cinema
Jammu and Kashmir Academy of Art, Culture and Languages

Notes and references

External links 
 The Parallel Post – An e-magazine

Film festivals in India
Film festivals established in 2011
2011 establishments in Jammu and Kashmir